Masazirgol, or Masazir Lake is a salty lake in Masazir, Azerbaijan located on the Absheron Peninsula on the West coast of the Caspian Sea.

The overall area of the lake is 10 km2.
Large volumes of chloride and sulphate are concentrated in ion composition of the water. A new salt making plant was built in 2010 for production of 2 Azeri brands of salt. The estimated amount of recoverable salt is 1,735 million tons. It is available in liquid (water) and clay forms.

Salt Production
Beginning in 1813, salt was extracted from the lake. The salt is taken from the surface as a salt layer or from water as tincture. A new salt making plant was built in 2010 for production of 2 Azeri brands of salt. The collected salt is sent off to be refined. The estimated amount of recoverable salt is 1,735 million tons. Masazir Salt Refinery is built near the lake.

See also
Refinery
Masazir
Salt Lakes

References

External links
Masazirgol satellite image from Wikimapia

Lakes of Azerbaijan